Krupin is a Russian masculine surname, its feminine counterpart (in Slavic countries) is Krupina. It may refer to
Janet Krupin (born 1987), American actress, singer, writer and producer
Vladimir Krupin (born 1941), Russian writer

Russian-language surnames